Rodolfo "Dolfo" Alicante Guanzon is a retired Filipino professional footballer and manager. He was coach at Far Eastern University in 2008 and 2009.
He coached at the PAREF Southridge School (ages 5–15) during the 1995-2009 school year.
He is the former coach of Green Archers United.

International career

International goals

References

External links
Philippines at FIFA.com

Living people
Filipino footballers
Filipino football head coaches
Philippines national football team managers
Philippines international footballers
Footballers from Iloilo
Sportspeople from Iloilo City
Association football sweepers
1960 births